Every Chance I Get is the third studio album by American country rap artist Colt Ford. It was released on May 3, 2011 through Average Joe's Entertainment Group.

The album includes the singles "Country Thang", featuring Eric Church, "She Likes To Ride In Trucks", featuring Craig Morgan. and "What I Call Home", featuring JB and the Moonshine Band. The original version of the single "Country Thang", which features Dallas Davidson on chorus vocals, does not appear on the album. As of the chart dated July 16, 2011, the album has sold 73,300 copies in the US.

Critical reception
Giving it four stars out of five, Steve Leggett of Allmusic thought that the album was "better" than Ford's first two. He also called Ford "a sly, passionate, and multi-layered writer". As of Oct. 2012 the album has sold 145,211.

Track listing

Charts

Weekly charts

Year-end charts

Singles

References

2011 albums
Colt Ford albums
Average Joes Entertainment albums